Bong Ti is a village and tambon (subdistrict) of Sai Yok District, in Kanchanaburi Province, Thailand. The tambon contains four villages.

Geography
Bong Ti Subdistrict is in the mountainous area of the Tenasserim Hills, close to the border with Myanmar.
There is a tarmac road connecting with Sinbyudaing in Myanmar at the western end of the subdistrict. In 2005 the tambon had a population of 3,894 people. Many of the local inhabitants are Karen people.

In 2015, sound from the meteor was reported in three districts of Kanchanaburi Province: Thong Pha Phum, Sai Yok, and Si Sawat. The Governor of Kanchanaburi Province, Wan-chai Osukhonthip, ordered police and Sai Yok National Park rangers to search Wang Krachae and Bong Ti subdistricts in Sai Yok District for meteor debris.

References

External links 

Pictures of the subdistrict

Tambon of Kanchanaburi Province
Populated places in Kanchanaburi province
Myanmar–Thailand border
Tenasserim Hills
Myanmar–Thailand border crossings